Pardes Mein Hai Mera Dil ( My Heart Lives In A Foreign Land) (International title:Chasing My Heart)  is an Indian television series produced by Ekta Kapoor under her banner Balaji Telefilms for Star Plus. The story, set in Austria, is inspired by the 1997 film Pardes and Manju Kapur's 2008 novel The Immigrant. It was shot in locations in India, Vienna and Innsbruck. The series stars Drashti Dhami as Naina Vivek Batra, Arjun Bijlani as Raghav Rajesh Mehra and Vineet Raina as Rehaan Karan Khurana. It went off air on 30 June 2017 with 170 episodes. It was replaced by Iss Pyaar Ko Kya Naam Doon 3.

Plot

Set in Austria, Raghav Mehra works in his rich Indian family. He loves the rich and spoilt Sanjana who ignores him. Naina Batra, a woman close to her family breaks up with her fiancé Amit due to her heart patient mother Asha's illness and leaves to Austria for the operation.

Naina and Raghav become friends. Raghav's grandmother Indumati fixes Naina's marriage with his cousin Veer. On the wedding day, he leaves after which Raghav sacrifices his love and marries Naina who feels betrayed but soon trusts him.

Sanjana is pregnant with Veer's child. Naina helps Raghav start a business in Austria. Indumati falls into a coma. A buyer Rehaan Khanna enters. Naina meets his wife Ahana and agrees to become a surrogate mother. Raghav misunderstands that Naina has an affair and carries someone else's baby.

Without justification, Raghav divorces Naina. Veer marries Sanjana who gives birth to a daughter Veera. Ahana meets with a car accident planned by Rehaan's stepmother Harjeet, and dies after telling Naina that the baby is in danger.

6 months later

Naina lives in India. Raghav is an arrogant businessman. Indumati wakes up from coma and mistakes Ahana's baby to be of Raghav and Naina. Rehaan learns that Ahana hired a surrogate so he began searching her and also told about this to Harjeet who now wants to kill Ahana's baby.

Naina gives premature birth to a baby boy Ahaan. Naina and Raghav grow closer as they confess their love but part ways amid misunderstandings. Rehaan attacks Raghav thinking he had kidnapped the baby. Raghav presumably dies thinking Naina cheated on him and Rehaan is Ahaan's father.

Naina marries Rehaan to look after Ahaan, and acts to be possessed by Ahana's ghost. Naina reveals Harjeet's true intentions. She tells Indumati that her marriage with Rehaan is real. Harjeet is arrested and tries to shoot Naina but Rehaan sacrifices himself indeed but got saved by Indu, Naina and Ishaan. Naina gives birth to Rehaan's son named Neil.

7 years later

Naina, Rehaan, Ishaan, Ahaan, Neil and Indumati live happily. Naina works as a tuition teacher and points towards Raghav's photo when her students question about her love story. She tells them that Raghav is her life as he told her the meaning of love and she will be united with him in heaven.

Cast

Main
 Drashti Dhami as Naina Batra Khurana / Naina Batra Mehra: Asha's daughter; Rajeev's sister; Raghav's widow; Rehaan's wife; Ishaan and Neil's mother; Ahaan's surrogate mother (2016–2017)
 Arjun Bijlani as Raghav Mehra: Swaraj's son; Sanjana's ex-lover; Naina's first husband; Ishaan's father (2016–2017) (Dead)
 Vineet Raina as Rehaan Khurana: Armaan's half-brother; Ahana's widower; Naina's husband; Ahaan and Neil's father (2017)

Recurring
 Surekha Sikri as Indumati Mehra: Madan, Swaraj and Balraj's mother; Veer, Akash, Shaurya, Ira and Raghav's grandmother (2016–2017)
 Alka Amin as Asha Batra: Rajeev and Naina's mother; Ayaan's grandmother (2016–2017)
 Adaa Khan as Ahana Khurana: Rehaan's first wife; Ahaan's mother (2017) (Dead)
 Sudha Chandran as Harjeet Khurana: Armaan's mother; Rehaan's step-mother (2017)
 Alok Narula as Rajeev Batra: Asha's son; Naina's elder brother; Chanchal's husband; Ayaan's father (2016–2017)
 Unknown as Ayaan Batra: Rajeev and Chanchal's son
 Sangeeta Kapure as Chanchal Batra: Rajeev's wife; Ayaan's mother (2016–2017)
 Rakesh Kukreti as Madan Mehra: Indumati's son; Swaraj and Balraj's brother; Sudha's husband; Veer and Akash's father (2016–2017)
 Manini Mishra as Sudha Mehra: Madan's wife; Veer and Akash's mother (2016–2017)
 Laksh Lalwani as Veer Mehra: Madan and Sudha's son; Akash's brother; Naina's ex-fiancé; Sanjana's husband; Veera's father (2016–2017) (Dead)
 Additi Gupta as Sanjana Mehra: Raghav's ex-lover; Veer's wife; Veera's mother (2016–2017)
 Gauri Singh as Seema (2017)
 Unknown as Veera Mehra: Veer and Sanjana's daughter 
 Lovekesh Solanki as Akash Mehra: Madan and Sudha's son; Veer's brother; Soumya's husband; Aman's father (2016–2017)
 Unknown as Soumya Mehra: Akash's wife; Aman's mother
 Unknown as Aman Mehra: Akash and Soumya's son
 Manish Khanna as Balraj Mehra: Indumati's son; Swaraj and Madan's brother; Parmeshwari's husband; Shaurya and Ira's father (2016–2017)
 Sonia Rakkar as Parmeshwari Mehra: Balraj's wife; Shaurya and Ira's mother (2016–2017)
 Ankit Shah as Sikandar "Shaurya" Mehra: Balraj and Parmeshwari's son; Ira's brother; Pragya's husband; Prayag's father (2016–2017)
 Unknown as Pragya Mehra: Shaurya's wife; Prayag's mother
 Unknown as Prayag Mehra: Shaurya and Pragya's son
 Rini Das as Iranjali "Ira" Khurana: Balraj and Parmeshwari's daughter; Shaurya's sister; Armaan's wife; Imraan's mother (2016–2017)
 Pulkit Bangia as Armaan Khurana: Harjeet's son; Rehaan's half-brother; Ira's husband; Imraan's father (2017)
 Parveen Kaur as Amit's mother (2016)
 Vicky Arora as Amit Vishwakarma: Manjari's son; Naina's ex-fiancé; Bella's boyfriend (2016)
 Lucinda Nicholas as Bella D'Costa: Amit's girlfriend (2016)

References

External links
 Pardes Mein Hai Mera Dil on Hotstar

Balaji Telefilms television series
2016 Indian television series debuts
2017 Indian television series endings
StarPlus original programming
Television shows set in Austria
Television shows set in Mumbai
Television shows based on Indian novels
Indian television soap operas
Serial drama television series